Francisco de Zárate y Terán (1610 – 21 December 1679) was a Roman Catholic prelate who served as Bishop of Cuenca (1664–1679) and Bishop of Segovia (1661–1664).

Biography
Francisco de Zárate y Terán was born in Madrid, Spain in 1610.
On 26 October 1660 he was selected by the King of Spain and confirmed by Pope Alexander VII on 21 February 1661 as Bishop of Segovia.
On 29 June 1661, he was consecrated bishop by Juan Merino López, Bishop of Valladolid, with Martín de Bonilla Granada, Bishop of Ávila, and Francisco Antonio Díaz de Cabrera, Bishop of Salamanca, serving as co-consecrators. 
On 23 October 1663, he was selected by the King of Spain and confirmed by Pope Alexander VII on 28 January 1664 as Bishop of Cuenca.
He served as Bishop of Cuenca until his death on 21 December 1679.

References

External links and additional sources
 (for Chronology of Bishops) 
 (for Chronology of Bishops) 
 (for Chronology of Bishops) 
 (for Chronology of Bishops) 

17th-century Roman Catholic bishops in Spain
Bishops appointed by Pope Alexander VII
1610 births
1679 deaths